Stalitella is a monotypic genus of Balkan woodlouse hunting spiders containing the single species, Stalitella noseki. It was first described by K. Absolon & J. Kratochvíl in 1932, and has only been found in Bosnia and Herzegovina and in Montenegro.

References

Dysderidae
Monotypic Araneomorphae genera